The 2021 Texas Rangers season was the 61st of the Texas Rangers franchise overall, their 50th in Arlington as the Rangers, and the 2nd season at Globe Life Field. The Rangers, despite an 18-18 start, would finish with a 60-102 record which was the 3rd worst record just behind the Baltimore Orioles and Arizona Diamondbacks. Outfielder Joey Gallo and starting pitcher Kyle Gibson were also traded at the trade deadline to the New York Yankees and Philadelphia Phillies respectively.

Offseason

Transactions
 December 2, 2020: Rangers non tender outfielders Danny Santana and Scott Heineman, and pitcher Jimmy Herget.
 December 3, 2020: Rangers sign pitcher Joe Gatto and re-sign outfielder Scott Heineman.
 December 8, 2020: Rangers trade pitcher Lance Lynn to the Chicago White Sox for pitchers Dane Dunning and Avery Weems.
 December 10, 2020: Rangers select pitcher Brett de Geus second overall in the Rule 5 draft.
 December 10, 2020: Rangers trade catcher Heriberto Hernandez, infielder Osleivis Basabe, and outfielder Alexander Ovalles to the Tampa Bay Rays for first basemen Nate Lowe and Jake Guenther, and a PTBNL.
 December 11, 2020: Rangers re-sign pitcher Jimmy Herget, outfielder Scott Heineman designated for assignment.
 December 11, 2020: Rangers sign outfielder David Dahl to a one year deal.
 December 15, 2020: Rangers trade pitcher Rafael Montero to the Seattle Mariners for pitcher Jose Corniell and a PTBNL.
 December 16, 2020: Rangers trade outfielder Scott Heineman to the Cincinnati Reds for infielder Jose Acosta.
 December 25, 2020: Rangers sign pitcher Kohei Arihara through the posting system.
 December 26, 2020: Rangers pitcher Art Warren is designated for assignment.
 January 6, 2021: Rangers trade pitcher Art Warren to the Cincinnati Reds for cash considerations.
 February 6, 2021: Rangers trade shortstop Elvis Andrus, catcher Aramis Garcia, and cash considerations to the Oakland Athletics for designated hitter Khris Davis, catcher Jonah Heim, and minor league pitcher Dane Acker.
 February 10, 2021: Rangers sign Mike Foltynewicz to one year deal.

Regular season

Season standings

American League West

American League Wild Card

Record against opponents

Game log

|- style="background:#ffbbbb;"
| 1 || April 1 || @ Royals || 10–14 || Hernández (1–0) || Cody (0–1) || Davis (1) || 9,155 || 0–1 || L1
|- style="background:#ffbbbb;"
| 2 || April 3 || @ Royals || 4–11 || Minor (1–0) || Sborz (0–1) || — || 8,889 || 0–2 || L2
|- style="background:#bbffbb;"
| 3 || April 4 || @ Royals || 7–3 || Lyles (1–0) || Singer (0–1) || — || 8,869 || 1–2 || W1
|- style="background:#ffbbbb;"
| 4 || April 5 || Blue Jays || 2–6 || Matz (1–0) || Foltynewicz (0–1) || — || 38,258 || 1–3 || L1
|- style="background:#bbffbb;"
| 5 || April 6 || Blue Jays || 7–4 || Dunning (1–0) || Roark (0–1) || Kennedy (1) || 18,585 || 2–3 || W1
|- style="background:#bbffbb;"
| 6 || April 7 || Blue Jays || 2–1 || Gibson (1–0) || Ryu (0–1) || Kennedy (2) || 16,876 || 3–3 || W2
|- style="background:#ffbbbb;"
| 7 || April 9 || Padres || 0–3 || Musgrove (2–0) || Arihara (0–1) || — || 27,575 || 3–4 || L1
|- style="background:#ffbbbb;"
| 8 || April 10 || Padres || 4–7 || Weathers (1–0) || Benjamin (0–1) || Melancon (4) || 35,856 || 3–5 || L2
|- style="background:#ffbbbb;"
| 9 || April 11 || Padres || 0–2 || Stammen (1–1) || Foltynewicz (0–2) || Melancon (5) || 26,723 || 3–6 || L3
|- style="background:#ffbbbb;"
| 10 || April 12 || @ Rays || 0–1 || Glasnow (1–0) || Hearn (0–1) || Castillo (3) || 3,627 || 3–7 || L4
|- style="background:#bbffbb;"
| 11 || April 13 || @ Rays || 8–3 || Gibson (2–0) || Yarbrough (0–2) || — || 4,753 || 4–7 || W1
|- style="background:#bbffbb;"
| 12 || April 14 || @ Rays || 5–1 || Arihara (1–1) || Fleming (0–1) || — || 3,021 || 5–7 || W2
|- style="background:#bbffbb;"
| 13 || April 15 || @ Rays || 6–4  || Sborz (1–1) || Reed (0–1) || Kennedy (3) || 4,217 || 6–7 || W3 
|- style="background:#ffbbbb;"
| 14 || April 16 || Orioles || 2–5 || López (1–2) || Foltynewicz (0–3) || Valdez (3) || 22,173 || 6–8 || L1
|- style="background:#ffbbbb;"
| 15 || April 17 || Orioles || 1–6 || Lakins (1–0) || Rodríguez (0–1) || — || 29,338 || 6–9 || L2
|- style="background:#bbffbb;"
| 16 || April 18 || Orioles || 1–0  || King (1–0) || Lakins (1–1) || — || 24,267 || 7–9 || W1
|- style="background:#bbffbb;"
| 17 || April 19 || @ Angels || 6–4 || Arihara (2–1) || Bundy (0–2) || Kennedy (4) || 11,396 || 8–9 || W2
|- style="background:#ffbbbb;"
| 18 || April 20 || @ Angels || 2–6 || Canning (1–1) || Lyles (1–1) || — || 12,544 || 8–10 || L1
|- style="background:#bbffbb;"
| 19 || April 21 || @ Angels || 7–4 || King (2–0) || Mayers (1–1) || — || 9,207 || 9–10 || W1
|- style="background:#ffbbbb;"
| 20 || April 23 || @ White Sox || 7–9 || Heuer (2–1) || Cody (0–2) || Hendriks (4) || 8,969 || 9–11 || L1
|- style="background:#ffbbbb;"
| 21 || April 24 || @ White Sox || 1–2 || Hendriks (1–0) || King (2–1) || — || 8,556 || 9–12 || L2
|- style="background:#ffbbbb;"
| 22 || April 25 || @ White Sox || 4–8 || Kopech (2–0) || Arihara (2–2) || — || 9,285 || 9–13 || L3
|- style="background:#ffbbbb;"
| 23 || April 26 || Angels || 4–9 || Ohtani (1–0) || Lyles (1–2) || — || 17,766 || 9–14 || L4
|- style="background:#bbffbb;"
| 24 || April 27 || Angels || 6–1 || Foltynewicz (1–3) || Quintana (0–2) || — || 16,103 || 10–14 || W1
|- style="background:#ffbbbb;"
| 25 || April 28 || Angels || 3–4 || Rodriguez (2–0) || Dunning (1–1) || Iglesias (4) || 17,875 || 10–15 || L1
|- style="background:#bbffbb;"
| 26 || April 29 || Red Sox || 4–1 || Gibson (3–0) || Pérez (0–2) || Kennedy (5) || 23,640 || 11–15 || W1
|- style="background:#ffbbbb;"
| 27 || April 30 || Red Sox || 1–6 || Eovaldi (4–2) || Arihara (2–3) || — || 28,267 || 11–16 || L1
|-

|- style="background:#bbffbb;"
| 28 || May 1 || Red Sox || 8–6 || Sborz (2–1) || Andriese (0–1) || Kennedy (6) || 35,129 || 12–16 || W1
|- style="background:#bbffbb;"
| 29 || May 2 || Red Sox || 5–3 || Sborz (3–1) || Ottavino (2–2) || Kennedy (7) || 29,190 || 13–16 || W2
|- style="background:#ffbbbb;"
| 30 || May 3 || @ Twins || 5–6 || Maeda (2–2) || Dunning (1–2) || Rogers (2) || 8,071 || 13–17 || L1
|- style="background:#bbffbb;"
| 31 || May 4 || @ Twins || 6–3  || Rodríguez (1–1) || Waddell (0–1) || Kennedy (8) || 8,022 || 14–17 || W1
|- style="background:#bbffbb;"
| 32 || May 5 || @ Twins || 3–1 || King (3–1) || Thorpe (0–1) || Kennedy (9) || 7,853 || 15–17 || W2
|- style="background:#bbffbb;"
| 33 || May 6 || @ Twins || 4–3  || Hearn (1–1) || Duffey (0–1) || Sborz (1) || 8,760 || 16–17 || W3
|- style="background:#ffbbbb;"
| 34 || May 7 || Mariners || 4–5 || Flexen (3–1) || Sborz (3–2) || Graveman (4) || 26,047 || 16–18 || L1
|- style="background:#bbffbb;"
| 35 || May 8 || Mariners || 9–8 || King (4–1) || Misiewicz (2–2) || Kennedy (10) || 26,616 || 17–18 || W1
|- style="background:#bbffbb;"
| 36 || May 9 || Mariners || 10–2 || Dunning (2–2) || Sheffield (2–3) || — || 30,632 || 18–18 || W2
|- style="background:#ffbbbb;"
| 37 || May 10 || @ Giants || 1–3 || Wood (4–0) || King (4–2) || McGee (9) || 7,450 || 18–19 || L1
|- style="background:#ffbbbb;"
| 38 || May 11 || @ Giants || 2–4 || Webb (2–3) || Lyles (1–3) || McGee (10) || 7,268 || 18–20 || L2
|- style="background:#ffbbbb;"
| 39 || May 13 || @ Astros || 3–4  || Raley (1–2) || Martin (0–1) || — || 16,340 || 18–21 || L3
|- style="background:#ffbbbb;"
| 40 || May 14 || @ Astros || 4–10 || Greinke (3–1) || Benjamin (0–2) || — || 24,495 || 18–22 || L4
|- style="background:#ffbbbb;"
| 41 || May 15 || @ Astros || 5–6 || García (1–3) || Dunning (2–3) || Pressly (7) || 25,858 || 18–23 || L5
|- style="background:#ffbbbb;"
| 42 || May 16 || @ Astros || 2–6 || Raley (2–2) || Rodríguez (1–2) || — || 26,069 || 18–24 || L6
|- style="background:#bbffbb;"
| 43 || May 17 || Yankees || 5–2 || Lyles (2–3) || Cole (5–2) || Kennedy (11) || 28,040 || 19–24 || W1
|- style="background:#ffbbbb;"
| 44 || May 18 || Yankees || 4–7 || Peralta (3–1) || Foltynewicz (1–4) || Chapman (10) || 26,522 || 19–25 || L1
|- style="background:#ffbbbb;"
| 45 || May 19 || Yankees || 0–2 || Kluber (4–2) || Yang (0–1) || — || 31,689 || 19–26 || L2
|- style="background:#ffbbbb;"
| 46 || May 20 || Yankees || 0–2 || Germán (4–2) || King (4–3) || Chapman (11) || 27,581 || 19–27 || L3
|- style="background:#bbffbb;"
| 47 || May 21 || Astros || 7–5  || Hearn (2–1) || Abreu (2–3) || — || 30,445 || 20–27 || W1
|- style="background:#bbffbb;"
| 48 || May 22 || Astros || 8–4 || Allard (1–0) || Scrubb (1–1) || — || 38,055 || 21–27 || W2
|- style="background:#bbffbb;"
| 49 || May 23 || Astros || 3–2  || King (5–3) || Pressly (2–1) || — || 36,444 || 22–27 || W3
|- style="background:#ffbbbb;"
| 50 || May 25 || @ Angels || 5–11 || Heaney (2–3) || Yang (0–2) || — || 10,987 || 22–28 || L1
|- style="background:#ffbbbb;"
| 51 || May 26 || @ Angels || 8–9 || Canning (4–3) || Dunning (2–4) || Iglesias (8) || 8,547 || 22–29 || L2
|- style="background:#ffbbbb;"
| 52 || May 27 || @ Mariners || 0–5 || Flexen (5–2) || Allard (1–1) || — || 9,008 || 22–30 || L3
|- style="background:#ffbbbb;"
| 53 || May 28 || @ Mariners || 2–3 || Sheffield (4–4) || Lyles (2–4) || Swanson (1) || 10,605 || 22–31 || L4
|- style="background:#ffbbbb;"
| 54 || May 29 || @ Mariners || 2–3 || Zamora (1–0) || Foltynewicz (1–5) || Montero (7) || 11,071 || 22–32 || L5
|- style="background:#ffbbbb;"
| 55 || May 30 || @ Mariners || 2–4 || Kikuchi (3–3) || Yang (0–3) || Middleton (4) || 11,198 || 22–33 || L6
|-

|- style="background:#ffbbbb;"
| 56 || June 1 || @ Rockies || 2–3  || Givens (2–2) || Martin (0–2) || — || 18,028 || 22–34 || L7
|- style="background:#ffbbbb;"
| 57 || June 2 || @ Rockies || 3–6 || Senzatela (2–5) || Evans (0–1) || Bard (6) || 19,289 || 22–35 || L8
|- style="background:#ffbbbb;"
| 58 || June 3 || @ Rockies || 6–11 || Gomber (4–5) || Foltynewicz (1–6) || — || 19,150 || 22–36 || L9
|- style="background:#bbffbb;"
| 59 || June 4 || Rays || 5–4 || Gibson (4–0) || Fleming (5–4) || Kennedy (12) || 30,635 || 23–36 || W1
|- style="background:#ffbbbb;"
| 60 || June 5 || Rays || 0–3 || Hill (5–2) || Allard (1–2) || Castillo (9) || 27,237 || 23–37 || L1
|- style="background:#ffbbbb;"
| 61 || June 6 || Rays || 1–7 || Feyereisen (2–2) || King (5–4) || — || 26,442 || 23–38 || L2
|- style="background:#ffbbbb;"
| 62 || June 8 || Giants || 4–9 || Álvarez (2–1) || Rodríguez (1–3) || — || 24,938 || 23–39 || L3
|- style="background:#bbffbb;"
| 63 || June 9 || Giants || 4–3  || Martin (1–2) || McGee (1–2) || — || 25,803 || 24–39 || W1
|- style="background:#ffbbbb;"
| 64 || June 11 || @ Dodgers || 1–12 || Kershaw (8–5) || Foltynewicz (1–7) || — || 20,220 || 24–40 || L1
|- style="background:#bbffbb;"
| 65 || June 12 || @ Dodgers || 12–1 || Allard (2–2) || Bauer (6–5) || — || 17,500 || 25–40 || W1
|- style="background:#ffbbbb;"
| 66 || June 13 || @ Dodgers || 3–5 || Buehler (6–0) || Dunning (2–5) || Jansen (15) || 15,508 || 25–41 || L1
|- style="background:#ffbbbb;"
| 67 || June 15 || @ Astros || 3–6  || Pressly (3–1) || Evans (0–2) || — || 26,379 || 25–42 || L2
|- style="background:#ffbbbb;"
| 68 || June 16 || @ Astros || 4–8 || Greinke (7–2) || Lyles (2–5) || — || 22,735 || 25–43 || L3
|- style="background:#ffbbbb;"
| 69 || June 18 || Twins || 5–7  || Robles (3–3) || Sborz (3–3) || Duffey (2) || 30,304 || 25–44 || L4
|- style="background:#ffbbbb;"
| 70 || June 19 || Twins || 2–3 || Thielbar (2–0) || King (5–5) || Rogers (7) || 34,044 || 25–45 || L5
|- style="background:#ffbbbb;"
| 71 || June 20 || Twins || 2–4 || Maeda (3–2) || Dunning (2–6) || Robles (6) || 34,007 || 25–46 || L6
|- style="background:#bbffbb;"
| 72 || June 21 || Athletics || 8–3 || Gibson (5–0) || Montas (7–7) || — || 20,259 || 26–46 || W1
|- style="background:#ffbbbb;"
| 73 || June 22 || Athletics || 6–13 || Irvin (5–7) || Hearn (2–2) || — || 19,185 || 26–47 || L1
|- style="background:#bbffbb;"
| 74 || June 23 || Athletics || 5–3 || Martin (2–2) || Petit (7–1) || Rodríguez (1) || 21,829 || 27–47 || W1
|- style="background:#ffbbbb;"
| 75 || June 24 || Athletics || 1–5 || Bassitt (8–2) || Allard (2–3) || — || 20,432 || 27–48 || L1
|- style="background:#bbffbb;"
| 76 || June 25 || Royals || 9–4 || Dunning (3–6) || Minor (6–5) || — || 30,389 || 28–48 || W1
|- style="background:#bbffbb;"
| 77 || June 26 || Royals || 8–0 || Gibson (6–0) || Bubic (2–3) || — || 31,612 || 29–48 || W2
|- style="background:#bbffbb;"
| 78 || June 27 || Royals || 4–1 || Lyles (3–5) || Singer (3–6) || Kennedy (13) || 29,046 || 30–48 || W3 
|- style="background:#bbffbb;"
| 79 || June 29 || @ Athletics || 5–4 || Foltynewicz (2–7) || Kaprielian (4–2) || Kennedy (14) || 4,739 || 31–48 || W4
|- style="background:#ffbbbb;"
| 80 || June 30 || @ Athletics || 1–3 || Bassitt (9–2) || Allard (2–4) || Trivino (13) || 4,320 || 31–49 || L1
|-

|- style="background:#bbffbb;"
| 81 || July 1 || @ Athletics || 8–3 || King (6–5) || Manaea (6–5) || — || 5,182 || 32–49 || W1  
|- style="background:#ffbbbb;"
| 82 || July 2 || @ Mariners || 4–5  || Misiewicz (3–3) || Hearn (2–3) || — || 28,638 || 32–50 || L1
|- style="background:#bbffbb;"
| 83 || July 3 || @ Mariners || 7–3 || Lyles (4–5) || Gonzales (1–5) || — || 16,046 || 33–50 || W1 
|- style="background:#ffbbbb;"
| 84 || July 4 || @ Mariners || 1–4 || Flexen (7–3) || Foltynewicz (2–8) || Graveman (8) || 15,146 || 33–51 || L1
|- style="background:#ffbbbb;"
| 85 || July 5 || Tigers || 3–7 || Peralta (2–1) || Allard (2–5) || — || 34,484 || 33–52 || L2
|- style="background:#bbffbb;"
| 86 || July 6 || Tigers || 10–5 || King (7–5) || Norris (0–3) || — || 24,367 || 34–52 || W1
|- style="background:#ffbbbb;"
| 87 || July 7 || Tigers || 3–5 || Funkhouser (3–0) || Gibson (6–1) || Soto (7) || 33,043 || 34–53 || L1
|- style="background:#bbffbb;"
| 88 || July 9 || Athletics || 3–2 || Lyles (5–5) || Irvin (6–8) || Kennedy (15) || 29,619 || 35–53 || W1 
|- style="background:#ffbbbb;"
| 89 || July 10 || Athletics || 4–8  || Wendelken (2–1) || Patton (0–1) || — || 30,030 || 35–54 || L1
|- style="background:#ffbbbb;"
| 90 || July 11 || Athletics || 1–4 || Bassitt (10–2) || Allard (2–6) || Trivino (14) || 30,531 || 35–55 || L2
|- style="background:#ffbbbb;"
| 91 || July 16 || @ Blue Jays || 2–10 || Ray (8–4) || Lyles (5–6) || — || 10,100 || 35–56 || L3
|- style="background:#bbb;"
| – || July 17 || @ Blue Jays || colspan=8 | Postponed (Rain; Makeup: July 18)
|- style="background:#ffbbbb;"
| 92 || July 18  || @ Blue Jays || 0–5  || Ryu (9–5) || Allard (2–7) || — || N/A || 35–57 || L4
|- style="background:#ffbbbb;"
| 93 || July 18  || @ Blue Jays || 0–10  || Matz (8–4) || Foltynewicz (2–9) || — || 12,335 || 35–58 || L5
|- style="background:#ffbbbb;"
| 94 || July 19 || @ Tigers || 0–14 || Jiménez (4–1) || Gibson (6–2) || — || 13,704 || 35–59 || L6
|- style="background:#ffbbbb;"
| 95 || July 20 || @ Tigers || 1–4 || Skubal (6–8) || Dunning (3–7) || Soto (9) || 13,333 || 35–60 || L7
|- style="background:#ffbbbb;"
| 96 || July 21 || @ Tigers || 2–4 || Manning (2–3) || Lyles (5–7) || Soto (10) || 21,132 || 35–61 || L8
|- style="background:#ffbbbb;"
| 97 || July 22 || @ Tigers || 5–7 || Funkhouser (4–0) || Foltynewicz (2–10) || Soto (11) || 16,033 || 35–62 || L9
|- style="background:#ffbbbb;"
| 98 || July 23 || @ Astros || 3–7 || Bielak (3–3) || Allard (2–8) || — || 38,853 || 35–63 || L10
|- style="background:#ffbbbb;"
| 99 || July 24 || @ Astros || 1–4 || Valdez (6–2) || Gibson (6–3) || — || 37,050 || 35–64 || L11
|- style="background:#ffbbbb;"
| 100 || July 25 || @ Astros || 1–3 || Greinke (10–3) || Santana (0–1) || Pressly (18) || 35,627 || 35–65 || L12
|- style="background:#bbffbb;"
| 101 || July 27 || Diamondbacks || 5–4 || Dunning (4–7) || Widener (1–1) || Kennedy (16) || 27,336 || 36–65 || W1  
|- style="background:#ffbbbb;"
| 102 || July 28 || Diamondbacks || 2–3 || Bumgarner (5–6) || Martin (2–3) || Clippard (1) || 26,607 || 36–66 || L1
|- style="background:#ffbbbb;"
| 103 || July 30 || Mariners || 5–9 || Gilbert (5–2) || Allard (2–9) || — || 27,542 || 36–67 || L2   
|- style="background:#bbffbb;"
| 104 || July 31 || Mariners || 5–4  || Patton (1–1) || Castillo (2–5) || — || 33,463 || 37–67 || W1
|-

|- style="background:#bbffbb;"
| 105 || August 1 || Mariners || 4–3 || Santana (1–1) || Swanson (0–1) || — || 23,664 || 38–67 || W2 
|- style="background:#bbffbb;"
| 106 || August 2 || Angels || 4–1 || Dunning (5–7) || Rodriguez (2–1) || Patton (1) || 20,533 || 39–67 || W3
|- style="background:#ffbbbb;"
| 107 || August 3 || Angels || 3–11 || Suárez (5–4) || Lyles (5–8) || — || 19,074 || 39–68 || L1
|- style="background:#ffbbbb;"
| 108 || August 4 || Angels || 1–2 || Ohtani (6–1) || Allard (2–10) || Iglesias (23) || 27,360 || 39–69 || L2
|- style="background:#ffbbbb;"
| 109 || August 5 || Angels || 0–5 || Bundy (2–8) || Howard (0–3) || — || 21,670 || 39–70 || L3
|- style="background:#ffbbbb;"
| 110 || August 6 || @ Athletics || 1–4  || Petit (8–1) || Herget (0–1) || — || 9,022 || 39–71 || L4 
|- style="background:#ffbbbb;"
| 111 || August 7 || @ Athletics || 3–12 || Irvin (8–10) || Anderson (0–1) || — || 10,082 || 39–72 || L5  
|- style="background:#ffbbbb;"
| 112 || August 8 || @ Athletics || 3–6 || Kaprielian (6–4) || Lyles (5–9) || Trivino (18) || 9,548 || 39–73 || L6
|- style="background:#bbffbb;"
| 113 || August 10 || @ Mariners || 5–4  || Martin (3–3) || Swanson (0–2) || — || 15,412 || 40–73 || W1   
|- style="background:#ffbbbb;"
| 114 || August 11 || @ Mariners || 1–2 || Steckenrider (4–2) || Santana (1–2) || — || 15,789 || 40–74 || L1  
|- style="background:#ffbbbb;"
| 115 || August 12 || @ Mariners || 1–3 || Gonzales (4–5) || Foltynewicz (2–11) || — || 14,031 || 40–75 || L2
|- style="background:#bbffbb;"
| 116 || August 13 || Athletics || 8–6 || Santana (2–2) || Irvin (8–11) || Barlow (1) || 26,761 || 41–75 || W1  
|- style="background:#ffbbbb;"
| 117 || August 14 || Athletics || 3–8 || Chafin (1–2) || Lyles (5–10) || — || 31,904 || 41–76 || L1
|- style="background:#bbffbb;"
| 118 || August 15 || Athletics || 7–4 || Allard (3–10) || Manaea (8–8) || Barlow (2) || 24,990 || 42–76 || W1 
|- style="background:#ffbbbb;"
| 119 || August 17 || Mariners || 1–3 || Anderson (6–8) || Hearn (2–4) || Sewald (5) || 15,140 || 42–77 || L1
|- style="background:#ffbbbb;"
| 120 || August 18 || Mariners || 1–3 || Gonzales (5–5) || Foltynewicz (2–12) || Steckenrider (5) || 19,119 || 42–78 || L2
|- style="background:#ffbbbb;"
| 121 || August 19 || Mariners || 8–9  || Smith (2–1) || Barlow (0–1) || Sewald (6) || 16,391 || 42–79 || L3
|- style="background:#ffbbbb;"
| 122 || August 20 || @ Red Sox || 0–6 || Sale (2–0) || Dunning (5–8) || — || 30,012 || 42–80 || L4  
|- style="background:#bbffbb;"
| 123 || August 21 || @ Red Sox || 10–1 || Lyles (6–10) || Rodríguez (9–7) || — || 32,495 || 43–80 || W1   
|- style="background:#bbbbbb;" 
| — || August 22 || @ Red Sox || colspan=7 | Postponed (rain, makeup August 23)
|- style="background:#ffbbbb;"
| 124 || August 23 || @ Red Sox || 4–8  || Whitlock (5–2) || Santana (2–3) || — || 27,652 || 43–81 || L1  
|- style="background:#bbffbb;"
| 125 || August 24 || @ Indians || 7–3 || Hearn (3–4) || Morgan (2–6) || — || 11,369 || 44–81 || W1
|- style="background:#ffbbbb;"
| 126 || August 25 || @ Indians || 2–7 || Plesac (8–4) || Latz (0–1) || — || 11,398 || 44–82 || L1
|- style="background:#ffbbbb;"
| 127 || August 26 || @ Indians || 6–10 || Stephan (3–0) || Lyles (6–11) || — || 10,827 || 44–83 || L2
|- style="background:#ffbbbb;"
| 128 || August 27 || Astros || 4–5 || Maton (3–0) || Martin (3–4) || Pressly (20) || 29,286 || 44–84 || L4
|- style="background:#ffbbbb;"
| 129 || August 28 || Astros || 2–5 || Valdez (9–4) || Allard (3–11) || Pressly (21) || 37,810 || 44–85 || L5
|- style="background:#bbffbb;"
| 130 || August 29 || Astros || 13–2 || Hearn (4–4) || Greinke (11–5) || — || 31,062 || 45–85 || W1
|- style="background:#bbffbb;"
| 131 || August 30 || Rockies || 4–3 || Alexy (1–0) || Márquez (11–10) || Barlow (3) || 14,990 || 46–85 || W2
|- style="background:#bbffbb;"
| 132 || August 31 || Rockies || 4–3 || Lyles (7–11) || Gomber (9–9) || Patton (2) || 18,383 || 47–85 || W3
|-

|- style="background:#ffbbbb;"
| 133 || September 1 || Rockies || 5–9 || Chacín (3–1) || Barlow (0–2) || — || 14,747 || 47–86 || L1
|- style="background:#ffbbbb;"
| 134 || September 3 || @ Angels || 2–3 || Ohtani (9–1) || Santana (2–4) || Iglesias (30) || 19,074 || 47–87 || L2 
|- style="background:#ffbbbb;"
| 135 || September 4 || @ Angels || 1–4 || Suárez (6–7) || Allard (3–12) || — || 22,697 || 47–88 || L3
|- style="background:#bbffbb;"
| 136 || September 5 || @ Angels || 7–3 || Hearn (5–4) || Junk (0–1) || — || 18,492 || 48–88 || W1
|- style="background:#bbffbb;"
| 137 || September 6 || @ Angels || 4–0 || Alexy (2–0) || Barría (2–3) || — || 16,241 || 49–88 || W2
|- style="background:#bbffbb;"
| 138 || September 7 || @ Diamondbacks || 3–1 || Lyles (8–11) || Gallen (2–9) || — || 8,758 || 50–88 || W3   
|- style="background:#bbffbb;"
| 139 || September 8 || @ Diamondbacks || 8–5 || Cotton (1–0) || Weaver (3–4) || Barlow (4) || 6,354 || 51–88 || W4
|- style="background:#ffbbbb;"
| 140 || September 10 || @ Athletics || 5–10 || Guerra (4–1) || Otto (0–1) || — || 7,157 || 51–89 || L1  
|- style="background:#bbffbb;"
| 141 || September 11 || @ Athletics || 8–6 || Martin (4–4) || Chafin (1–3) || Barlow (5) || 7,945 || 52–89 || W1
|- style="background:#bbffbb;"
| 142 || September 12 || @ Athletics || 4–3 || Hearn (6–4) || Kaprielian (7–5) || Barlow (6) || 6,983 || 53–89 || W2  
|- style="background:#ffbbbb;"
| 143 || September 13 || Astros || 1–15 || Javier (4–1) || Howard (0–4) || — || 18,903 || 53–90 || L1
|- style="background:#bbffbb;"
| 144 || September 14 || Astros || 8–1 || Lyles (9–11) || Greinke (11–6) || — || 19,451 || 54–90 || W1
|- style="background:#ffbbbb;"
| 145 || September 15 || Astros || 2–7 || Urquidy (7–3) || Arihara (2–4) || — || 20,991 || 54–91 || L1 
|- style="background:#ffbbbb;"
| 146 || September 16 || Astros || 1–12 || García (11–7) || Otto (0–2) || — || 19,121 || 54–92 || L2
|- style="background:#ffbbbb;"
| 147 || September 17 || White Sox || 0–8 || Cease (12–7) || Hearn (6–5) || — || 28,288 || 54–93 || L3  
|- style="background:#bbffbb;"
| 148 || September 18 || White Sox || 2–1 || Anderson (1–2) || Lynn (10–5) || Barlow (7) || 31,121 || 55–93 || W1
|- style="background:#ffbbbb;"
| 149 || September 19 || White Sox || 2–7 || Giolito (10–9) || Lyles (9–12) || — || 24,918 || 55–94 || L1
|- style="background:#ffbbbb;"
| 150 || September 20 || @ Yankees || 3–4 || Green (8–7) || Alexy (2–1) || Chapman (28) || 22,160 || 55–95 || L2
|- style="background:#ffbbbb;"
| 151 || September 21 || @ Yankees || 1–7 || Montgomery (6–6) || Dunning (5–9) || — || 23,335 || 55–96 || L3
|- style="background:#ffbbbb;"
| 152 || September 22 || @ Yankees || 3–7 || Green (9–7) || Patton (1–2) || — || 25,170 || 55–97 || L4
|- style="background:#ffbbbb;"
| 153 || September 23 || @ Orioles || 0–3 || Lowther (1–2) || Otto (0–3) || Wells (4) || 6,328 || 55–98 || L5
|- style="background:#bbffbb;"
| 154 || September 24 || @ Orioles || 8–5 || Sborz (4–3) || Greene (1–3) || Barlow (8) || 7,935 || 56–98 || W1
|- style="background:#ffbbbb;'
| 155 || September 25 || @ Orioles || 2–3 || Kriske (2–1) || Lyles (9–13) || Tate (3) || 10,645 || 56–99 || L1
|- style="background:#bbffbb;"
| 156 || September 26 || @ Orioles || 7–4 || Cotton (2–0) || Means (6–8) || Barlow (9) || 13,495 || 57–99 || W1
|- style="background:#bbffbb;"
| 157 || September 28 || Angels || 5–2 || Alexy (3–1) || Naughton (0–4) || Barlow (10) || 20,066 || 58–99 || W2
|- style="background:#ffbbbb;"
| 158 || September 29 || Angels || 2–7 || Quijada (1–2) || Hearn (6–6) || — || 23,241 || 58–100 || L1 
|- style="background:#bbffbb;"
| 159 || September 30 || Angels || 7–6 || Patton (2–2) || Herget (2–3) || Barlow (11) || 19,960 || 59–100 || W1 
|-

|- style="background:#ffbbbb;"
| 160 || October 1 || Indians || 6–9 || Morgan (5–7) || Howard (0–5) || — || 22,700 || 59–101 || L1
|- style="background:#bbffbb;"
| 161 || October 2 || Indians || 7–2 || Lyles (10–13) || McKenzie (5–9) || — || 27,362 || 60–101 || W1
|- style="background:#ffbbbb;"
| 162 || October 3 || Indians || 0–6 || Civale (6–0) || Dunning (5–10) || — || 28,396 || 60–102 || L1
|-

Roster

Farm system

References

External links
 2021 Texas Rangers season at Baseball-Reference.com
 2020 Texas Rangers fullseason schedule and
 Statistics  at MLB.com

Texas Rangers seasons
Texas Rangers
Texas Rangers